Liz Cole is an international lawn bowler representing Jersey.

Bowls career
Cole has represented Jersey at the Commonwealth Games in the fours at the 2002 Commonwealth Games. The four finished second in their section before losing in the quarter finals against Canada.

In 2007 she won the fours gold medal at the Atlantic Bowls Championships

References 

Living people
Jersey female bowls players
Bowls players at the 2002 Commonwealth Games
Year of birth missing (living people)